Subari Dam is a gravity dam located in Akita Prefecture in Japan. The dam is used for flood control, irrigation and power production. The catchment area of the dam is 100 km2. The dam impounds about 192  ha of land when full and can store 42500 thousand cubic meters of water. The construction of the dam was started on 1966 and completed in 1970.

References

Dams in Akita Prefecture
1970 establishments in Japan